Datunying is a rural town in Ningxiang City, Hunan Province, China. It is surrounded by Huaminglou Town on the north, Daolin Town on the east, and Shaoshan City on the southwest.

Administrative division

The town is divided into one community and six villages: 
 Shijiawan Community
 Jinxing
 Datunying
 Baiyang
 Shaoguang
 Meihu
 Sanxianao

Geography
The Jin River, a tributary of the Xiang River, flows through the town.

Economy
Tea and tobacco are important to the economy.

Education
There is one senior high school located with the town limits: Ningxiang Ninth Senior High School.

Culture
Huaguxi is the most influence local theater.

Transportation

County Road
The County Roads X089 and X217 pass across the town.

Expressway
The Shaoshan Expressway passes north through Datunying Town.

Railway
The Shanghai–Kunming high-speed railway passes through the town east to west.

Celebrity

Ouyang Qin, politician.
Zhou Dawu, general.
Zhu Jianfan, educator.
 Cheng Wenshan; 1929–2008), educator.

References

External links

Divisions of Ningxiang
Ningxiang